HKFS may refer to:

Hong Kong Federation of Students, a student organisation by the student unions of four higher education institutions in Hong Kong
Hong Kong Flower Show, an annual exhibition presented by the Leisure and Cultural Services Department of Hong Kong